William Frederick Brooks (March 1, 1863 – March 19, 1928) was an American businessman and politician.

Brooks was born in Battle Creek, Michigan and he moved to Minneapolis, Minnesota, with his family, in 1875. Brooks graduated from Central High School in Minneapolis. Brooks received his bachelor's degree in mechanical engineering from Worcester Institute of Technology, Worcester, Massachusetts (new Worcester Polytechnic Institute in 1884. Brooks was involved with the lumber and paper businesses in Minneapolis. Brooks served in the Minnesota Senate from 1919 until his death in 1928 and was a Republican.

References

1863 births
1928 deaths
People from Battle Creek, Michigan
Businesspeople from Minneapolis
Politicians from Minneapolis
American civil engineers
Worcester Polytechnic Institute alumni
Republican Party Minnesota state senators